The 2018 European Cross Country Championships was the 25th edition of the cross country running competition for European athletes. It was hosted in Tilburg, Netherlands.

Medal summary

Race results

Senior men

Senior women

Senior mixed relay

U23 men

U23 women

U20 men

U20 women

References

External links
 Official website 
 Official results

International athletics competitions hosted by the Netherlands
2018
December 2018 sports events in Europe
2018 European Cross Country Championships
2018 in athletics (track and field)
2018 in Dutch sport